The 2000 Elite League speedway season was the 66th season of the top tier of speedway in the United Kingdom. It was the fourth known as the Elite League and was governed by the Speedway Control Board (SCB), in conjunction with the British Speedway Promoters' Association (BSPA).

Season summary
In 2000, the league decreased to nine teams with the Hull Vikings dropping back down to the Premier League after just one season. The league operated on a standard format without play-offs.

Eastbourne Eagles claimed the millennium season league title but only finished two points clear of King's Lynn Knights. Martin Dugard topped scored for the Eagles but was well supported by their new signing Joe Screen from Hull Vikings. Three other English riders finished with averages in excess of 7 which was the crucial difference during the season. They were David Norris, Paul Hurry and Dean Barker. The King's Lynn Australian pairing of Leigh Adams and Jason Crump topped the league averages but did not have the back up that Eastbourne relied on. King's Lynn gained consolation when winning the Knockout Cup.

Final table

Oxford v Belle Vue not held.

Elite League Knockout Cup
The 2000 Speedway Star Knockout Cup was the 62nd edition of the Knockout Cup for tier one teams. King's Lynn Stars were the winners of the competition.

First round

Quarter-finals

Semi-finals

Final

First leg

Second leg

King's Lynn Knights were declared Knockout Cup Champions, on aggregate score 100-80.

Leading final averages

Riders & final averages
Belle Vue

 8.34
 7.02
 7.00
 6.45
	6.20
 6.20
 5.78
 5.58
 5.37
 5.38
 4.64
 3.76
 2.20

Coventry

 9.00 
 8.77 
 7.63 
 5.35
 5.34
 5.30
 5.26
 4.56

Eastbourne

 9.67 
 8.82
 7.73
 7.34
 7.20
 7.02
 5.73
 2.89

Ipswich

 9.57
 9.52
 6.53
 6.51
 6.13
 4.65
 4.15
 3.51
 3.46

King's Lynn

 10.17
 10.15
 7.98
 6.86
 6.57 
 5.88
 4.40
 4.14

Oxford

 8.24
 7.97
 7.36
 6.93
 5.49
 5.27
 4.57
 4.54
 4.26

Peterborough

 9.18 
 8.69
 6.85
 6.84
 5.92
 5.82
 5.67
 5.46
 4.50
 4.47

Poole

 10.10 
 8.57
 7.60
 7.21
 5.17
 4.26
 3.41
 1.28

Wolverhampton

 8.32
 7.94
 7.75
 7.48
 5.79
 5.55
 3.72

See also
List of United Kingdom Speedway League Champions
Knockout Cup (speedway)

References

SGB Premiership
2000 in British motorsport